The 2011 Washington Huskies football team represented the University of Washington in the 2011 NCAA Division I FBS football season. The team was coached by third year head coach Steve Sarkisian. They played six of their home games at Husky Stadium and their final home game at CenturyLink Field due to a planned renovation of Husky Stadium; both stadiums are in Seattle. They are a member of the North Division of the Pac-12 Conference. They finished the season 7–6, 5–4 in Pac-12 play to finish in third place in the North division. They were invited to the Alamo Bowl where they were defeated by Baylor 67–56.

Schedule

Roster and coaching staff

Game Starters
The follow players were the game starters.

% – started as second/third tight end       + – started as third/fourth wide receiver

^ – started as fifth defensive back

Game summaries

Eastern Washington

Washington Husky cornerback Desmond Trufant intercepted a pass by Eastern Washington Eagles' quarterback Bo Levi Mitchell in the end zone with 29 seconds left to preserve a 30–27 win on September 3. Trufant wrestled the pass away from 6-foot-5 Eagles receiver Brandon Kaufman. Mitchell passed for 473 yards on the night, completed 39 of 69 passes, and had 3 touchdowns against 2 interceptions. For Washington, quarterback Keith Price threw three touchdown passes and completed 17 of 25 passes for 102 yards, and running back Chris Polk ran for 125 yards on 23 carries. Washington gained fewer total yards than Eastern Washington – 250 yards compared to 504 for the Eagles – but had zero turnovers while the Eagles gave up the ball four times. Trufant had forced another one of those turnovers during the first quarter; he stripped Matt Johnson on a punt return and created a short field for the Huskies that led to a 7-yard touchdown pass from Price to Jonathan Amosa.

After the game, the Pac-12 Conference named Trufant Pac-12 defensive player of week. Washington placekicker Erik Folk was named Pac-12 special teams player of the week. Polk was a perfect 3-for-3 on field goals during the game and all three of his field goals came from outside of 40 yards.

Hawaii

Nebraska

California

Utah

Colorado

Stanford

Arizona

Oregon

USC

Oregon State

Washington State

    
    
    
    
    
    
    
    
    

Keith Price threw three touchdown passes to become Washington's all-time single-season leader in that category, the final one a 22-yard toss to Chris Polk, and Washington held off rival Washington State 38–21 on Saturday night to win the 104th Apple Cup. Price threw his 29th touchdown pass of the season midway through the third quarter, finding Polk on a wheel-route out of the backfield to give the Huskies a 28–14 lead.

Washington State pulled within 28–21, but Erik Folk's 46-yard field goal early in the fourth quarter pushed the lead to 10 and Polk sealed the Huskies third straight Apple Cup title on his 1-yard TD run with 5:23 left.

Price, who sat out last week's loss at Oregon State due to a multitude of injuries, finished 21 of 29 for 291 yards. Washington also got a blocked punt that Jesse Callier returned 2 yards for a touchdown in the first quarter.

The Cougars fired head coach Paul Wulff the following week.

Baylor (Alamo Bowl)

Entering their first game in the Alamo Bowl, the Huskies has a 16–14–1 overall bowl game record, going back to their first game in the 1924 Rose Bowl. The Huskies set new school record during the season in passing touchdowns (32) and in fewest fumbles (11).

Rankings

References

Washington
Washington Huskies football seasons
Washington Huskies football